Hebecnema nigra is a fly from the family Muscidae. It is found in the Palearctic.

References

Muscidae
Diptera of Europe
Insects described in 1830